Oak Hill Township may refer to:
 Oak Hill Township, Crawford County, Missouri
 Oak Hill Township, Granville County, North Carolina, in Granville County, North Carolina

Township name disambiguation pages